The 2004 Tulsa Golden Hurricane football team represented the University of Tulsa in the 2004 NCAA Division I-A football season. The team's head coach was Steve Kragthorpe. They played home games at Skelly Stadium in Tulsa, Oklahoma and competed in their final season as a member of the Western Athletic Conference.

Schedule

References

Tulsa
Tulsa Golden Hurricane football seasons
Tulsa Golden Hurricane football